Peter Moore (born 1983)  is a British historian, lecturer and podcaster.

Career
Moore studied at Durham University, then lived in Madrid before beginning an MA in non-fiction writing at City, University of London. His first book was Damn His Blood, a non-fiction account of the Oddingley Murders.

His second book, The Weather Experiment, told the story of the invention of the modern weather forecast through the life of its founder, Robert FitzRoy. It was chosen by the New York Times as one of the 100 Notable Books of 2015.

In 2018 Endeavour, was published. It narrated the history of HM Bark Endeavour, the ship James Cook sailed on his first voyage to the South Seas (1768-1771). Endeavour was a Sunday Times bestseller.

Moore teaches Creative Writing at Oxford University and presents a history podcast called Travels Through Time.

References

1983 births
British historians
Living people
Alumni of Collingwood College, Durham
Alumni of City, University of London